Sajini is a village in the Istria region of Croatia, Barban municipality, approximately 20 km north-east of Pula. Its population is 190 (2011 census).

References

Populated places in Istria County